Baumea articulata, commonly known as jointed rush, is a sedge in the sedge family, Cyperaceae, that is native to Western Australia. It blooms between September and December producing red-brown flowers on pendulous inflorescences.

It is found around swamps and on the margins of lakes along coastal areas in the Mid West, Wheatbelt, Peel, South West, Great Southern and Goldfields-Esperance where it grows in damp black sandy soils.

References

articulata
Plants described in 1969
Flora of Western Australia